Xylota furcata is a species of hoverfly in the family Syrphidae.

Distribution
West Java.

References

Eristalinae
Insects described in 1982
Diptera of Asia